Tricon may refer to:
 Tricon Global Restaurants, a spin-off company of PepsiCo that, after a merger, became known as Yum! Brands
 Tricon Residential, formerly Tricon Capital, a Canadian real estate company
 Tricon, an alternate name for the 24th World Science Fiction Convention, a convention held in three cities in 1966
 Tricon Award, an award presented to Lady Gaga at the 2020 MTV Video Music Awards
 Tricon container, an intermodal shipping container one-third the size of a standard 20-foot container
 Tricon, a consortium related to the Senator Lines shipping company
 Tricon Films & Television, a production company that produced content such as the television series Cock'd Gunns
 TRICON Garage, an automobile racing team formerly known as David Gilliland Racing
 Tricon systems, an industrial safety-shutdown technology system produced by the company Triconex
 Tricon Design, a company involved in the design of the Doha Metro
 Tricon, a logo used by BBC Three
 Vincent Tricon, the editor of the film Divines
 Tricon, the term for having three-of-a-kind in the card game Commerce
 Tricon, a term for having three or four cards of the same denomination in the card game Hoc Mazarin
 Tricon International Airlines, a defunct airline of the United States